The 1974–75 season saw the 24th competition for the FDGB-Pokal.

89 teams participated. After a qualifying round pitting 6 clubs from the second-tier DDR-Liga against each other, the first round and an additional intermediate round were played with 55 teams from the 1973-74 DDR-Liga, the teams relegated from the first-tier DDR-Oberliga after the 1973-74 season and the 15 winners of the various 1973-74 Bezirkspokal competitions.

By the round of the last 16, all Bezirkspokal winners had been eliminated, and only two second-tier teams, 1. FC Union Berlin and Motor Nordhausen remained in the competition. As had been done in the past two competitions, fixtures were played over two legs from the round of 16 to the semifinals.

The semifinal saw a repeat of last year's final, with Dynamo Dresden and FC Carl Zeiss Jena playing each other. Dresden won through and met BSG Sachsenring Zwickau who had beaten BSG Wismut Aue in the semifinal. For the first time since 1950 the final was held in East Berlin's Stadion der Weltjugend. For the first time ever an FDGB-Pokal final was decided on penalties.

Preliminary round

Round 1

Intermediate round

Round 2 

The match was counted as a loss for FCK as they had fielded an ineligible player. However, as Löbau failed to spot the infraction while reviewing the opposition's lineup as is customary, they were not awarded a win. Neither team progressed.

Last 16

Quarter finals

Semifinals 
(15 and 22 March 1975)

Final

Statistics

Match review 

Dynamo Dresden were clear cut favorites in this Saxon derby. They had finished third in the league and had three East German internationals in their line-up: Dörner, Wätzlich and Häfner. Sachsenring Zwickau had finished 7th in the league and their only international player was goalkeeper Jürgen Croy. But in front of a crowd of 55,000 Dresden could not cope with their role as favorites from the beginning. Their famous midfield with Häfner, Geyer and Ganzera couldn't find their rhythm, instead Dynamo's play was dominated by nervousness. On the other hand, Zwickau failed to put their opponents under pressure, despite valiant efforts. Additionally, bad luck struck them when midfielder Leuschner had to be substituted due to injury in the 11th minute. 
When Heidler eventually put Dresden in the lead after 65 minutes, the match seemed to go in the expected direction, but Zwickau struck back. Eight minutes later, their goalscorer Schykowski equalised and the match went into extra time. Ten minutes before the end of extra time, Dresden again took the lead through a goal by Richter who had been subbed in after 80 minutes, but just before the final whistle Zwickau's left winger Nestler could equalise once more. Therefore, the final, for the first time in FDGB-Pokal history, had to be decided by penalty kicks. Here Zwickau's goalkeeper Croy became the hero of the day, first saving two penalty kicks and then converting the final kick for the 4-3 victory.

References 

1974-75
East
Cup